SRC Kale (Macedonian "Спортско рекреативен центар Кале"-Sports and Recreation Center) is a multi-functional indoor sports arena. Kale means Fortress Citadel, named after the Skopje's Fortress, located right next to the hall. The capacity of the hall is 2,300 spectators.

Hall is also known as “Macedonian handball fortress”. The hall is mainly used for handball, although it is suitable for matches in others sports: boxing, wrestling, basketball, volleyball, and music concerts.

Important matches played in SRC Kale
 Finals in the Women's EHF Champions League – Kometal Gjorce Petrov (2000 – Hypo, 2002 – Herz, 2005 – Slagelse)
 Women Handball Super Cup - 2002
 Women's Junior Handball World Championship - 2003
 Men's Junior Handball Championship - 2007
 Women's Junior Handball Championship - 2008

References 

Handball venues in North Macedonia
Indoor arenas in North Macedonia
Sport in Skopje
Basketball venues in North Macedonia
Volleyball venues in North Macedonia